Kinda Municipality (Kinda kommun) is a municipality in Östergötland County, southeast Sweden. The municipal seat is located in the town Kisa, with some 4,000 inhabitants.

The present municipality was created in 1974 through the amalgamation of three municipalities called Norra Kinda, Södra Kinda and Västra Kinda (North, South and West Kinda respectively), which had been formed in 1952 from the nine original entities. The name was taken from the old Kinda Hundred.

Localities
Horn
Kisa (seat)
Rimforsa

Nature
Naturewise, the municipality is above all known for the Kinda Canal, a waterway of canals taking boat tours from lake Roxen south through Linköping, ending in Horn. The total of distance is 90 km.

References

External links

Kinda Municipality - Official site
Kinda Canal - Site in Swedish, English and German

 
Municipalities of Östergötland County